Liechtensteinklamm (Liechtenstein Gorge) is a particularly narrow gorge with walls up to 300m high, located in the Austrian Alps 50 km south of Salzburg.   It is around 4 km long and named after Johann II of Liechtenstein who had the walkways installed in 1875.

The gorge is around 4 km in length of which 1 km is accessible to visitors by means of wooden walkways (closed in winter months). It has a depth of up to 300m and in some places is only a few meters wide. At the end of the gorge is a waterfall. It receives around 100,000 visitors a year.

The waters of the Großarler Ache, a mountain stream, formed the gorge over thousands of years. In 1875 work began by members of the Pongau Alpine Club to make the gorge accessible, however was unfinished due to a lack of funds. Prince Johann II. of Liechtenstein, who ran a hunting lodge in the nearby Großarl, donated 600 guilders for an expansion of the work. At the completion of work in 1876 the gorge was renamed to honour the generous donation from the Prince.

According to legend, the gorge was created when the devil full of anger and rage over a failed plan, flew across the canyon throwing water into it with such force as to carve the rock.

External links
Official Site

Canyons and gorges of Austria
Landforms of Salzburg (state)
Tourist attractions in Salzburg (state)